Dessumia is a genus of beetles in the family Buprestidae, containing the following species:

 Dessumia atrata (Bourgoin, 1922)
 Dessumia vitalisi (Bourgoin, 1922)

References

Buprestidae genera